Bleak House is a fifteen-part BBC television drama serial adaptation of the Charles Dickens novel of the same name, which was originally published in 1852–53 as itself a print serialisation over 20 months. Produced with an all-star cast, the serial was shown on BBC One from 27 October to 16 December 2005, and drew much critical and popular praise. It has been reported that the total cost of the production was in the region of £8 million.

Written by Andrew Davies, the serial was produced by Nigel Stafford-Clark and directed by Justin Chadwick and Susanna White.

Plot
The longstanding estate battle of Jarndyce v Jarndyce hangs over the heads of many conflicting heirs, confused by multiple wills. Possible beneficiary John Jarndyce of Bleak House welcomes orphaned cousins Ada Clare and Richard Carstone—also potential heirs—as his wards, and has hired Esther Summerson as a housekeeper and companion for Ada. Honoria, Lady Dedlock, the wife of the imperious baronet Sir Leicester, is also a possible beneficiary of the estate. The Dedlocks' lawyer, Tulkinghorn, sniffs out a connection between Lady Dedlock and a recently deceased man called Nemo; as he tries to discover Nemo's true identity, Lady Dedlock secretly seeks information about the dead man herself. Meanwhile, Richard and Ada are falling in love. Richard keeps changing his mind on which career to pursue—first a physician, then a lawyer and then a soldier—but the prospect of his inheritance from the ongoing litigation begins to consume him, despite warnings from John, now his formal guardian. Esther and the young doctor Allan Woodcourt are attracted to each other, but Esther feels unworthy and Allan accepts a commission as a navy physician.

The law clerk Mr. Guppy, enamoured of Esther, hopes to win her affection by helping her discover the identity of her parents. He finds connections to both Lady Dedlock and the deceased Nemo, who has been identified as Captain James Hawdon, and is eventually alerted to the existence of letters left behind by Hawdon but kept by his drunken landlord, Krook. Realizing that Esther is her daughter whom she was told had died—fathered by Hawdon before her current marriage—Lady Dedlock confesses to Esther but swears her to secrecy. Esther is stricken by smallpox and nearly dies; she recovers but is terribly scarred. John proposes marriage to Esther, but though she accepts, he convinces her to keep it secret until she is sure it is what she wants. While amassing other enemies, Tulkinghorn deduces Lady Dedlock's secret and tries to use it to keep her in line.

Tulkinghorn is murdered, with no shortage of suspects. Lady Dedlock is implicated, but Inspector Bucket reveals that her former maid Hortense is the murderess and had tried to frame Lady Dedlock. Richard and Ada are secretly married, but he is obsessed with the lawsuit, encouraged by John's unscrupulous friend Harold Skimpole and the conniving lawyer Vholes. As a result, Richard is penniless and his health is failing. Hawdon's letters—written by a young Lady Dedlock and revealing her secret–find their way back into the hands of the moneylender Smallweed, who sells them to Sir Leicester. Guilty over her deception and not wanting to bring ruin to her husband, Lady Dedlock flees into a storm before Sir Leicester is able to tell her he does not care about her past. He has a stroke but sends Bucket after her. Bucket eventually realizes where she must be—the graveyard where Hawdon is buried—but Esther arrives to find her mother dead from exposure. A final Jarndyce will is found that closes the case in favour of Richard and Ada, but the estate has been consumed by years of legal fees. Richard collapses, overcome by tuberculosis, and soon dies. Allan professes his love for Esther, who rebuffs him out of obligation to John, and Ada, pregnant, returns to Bleak House. John releases Esther from their engagement, knowing that she really loves Allan. Esther and Allan marry, with all in attendance.

Adaptation
The adaptation is eight hours in length and covers most of the characters and storylines in the novel. Characters from the book who are not present include the wife of Snagsby, the law stationer; the wife and grandson of the moneylender Smallweed; the law clerk Tony Jobling; the bankrupt Jellyby; Sir Leicester Dedlock's several cousins; and the Bagnet family, friends of the ex-soldier Sergeant George. The character of Clamb, clerk to the lawyer Tulkinghorn, was created by the screenwriter as a device for showing Tulkinghorn's motives and deeds without recourse to a narrator.

Most of the storylines are portrayed substantially as they are in the novel, but somewhat abbreviated. The exceptions to this are in large part consequent to the aforementioned cull of minor characters. The plot mechanics around the possession of Lady Dedlock's letters, which involve Tony Jobling and Smallweed Junior in the novel, are considerably altered, as are the mechanics of the reconciliation between George and his mother, which is brought about by Mrs. Bagnet in the book. The storyline concerning Mrs. Snagsby's paranoid jealousy of her husband is omitted altogether.

Production overview
The serial was produced in-house by the BBC with some co-production funding from United States PBS broadcaster WGBH. It was shown on BBC One, on Thursdays at 20:00 and Fridays at 20:30, following the BBC's most popular programme—EastEnders—in an attempt to attract more viewers, particularly younger ones. The series started with an hour long on Thursday 27 October 2005, with subsequent episodes being 30 minutes, shown twice weekly. The serial was designed to air in the format of a soap opera, somewhat experimental for the television drama genre, but in keeping with Dickens' original serialisation. BBC One showed omnibus editions of each week's episodes on the Sunday following first broadcast.

Though some critics have argued against the series being shown in this format, programme makers and commentators defended their decision by saying that Dickens's writings were long, complex, very popular stories told over a series of small instalments, just like a soap-opera and claiming that if he had been alive in 2005 he would have been writing for big signature dramas. Bleak House was indeed originally published in monthly instalments, with cliffhangers used to maintain the continuing interest of the readership.

In the United States, the eight hours were broadcast on PBS on Masterpiece Theatre, where they were compressed and slightly edited into six instalments.  The opening and closing episodes were two hours in length, and the middle four episodes were each a single hour.  Most PBS stations showed the first-run for the new week's instalment at 21:00 on Sundays from 22 January to 26 February 2006. Bleak House was rebroadcast on Masterpiece Theatre in 2007.  Four instalments, two hours each, were shown on most PBS stations from 22 April to 13 May.

Some other overseas broadcasters, such as Australia's ABC, purchased the series in an eight-part, one-hour-episode format.

The programme is also notable for being one of the first British drama series to be shot and produced in the high-definition television format, which required the make-up and set design to be much more detailed than previous productions.

It was filmed on location in Hertfordshire, Bedfordshire, and Kent from February 2005 through to July 2005. The exterior of the Dedlock's country house Chesney Wold, was represented by Cobham Hall in Kent, as was the exterior of Mr Tulkinghorn's Office. Cobham Hall was also used for some interiors of Chesney Wold such as the hallway and the staircase. The exterior of Bleak House was represented by Ingatestone Hall in Essex. Other houses used for interior shots and garden locations include Balls Park in Hertfordshire, Bromham Hall in Bromham, Bedfordshire, and Luton Hoo in Bedfordshire.

Cast

 Gillian Anderson – Lady Honoria Dedlock
 Timothy West – Sir Leicester Dedlock
 Charles Dance – Mr. Tulkinghorn, Sir Leicester's lawyer
 Denis Lawson – John Jarndyce, a rich, friendly man
 Patrick Kennedy – Richard Carstone, ward to Mr. Jarndyce
 Carey Mulligan – Ada Clare, ward to Mr. Jarndyce
 Anna Maxwell Martin – Esther Summerson, housekeeper to Mr. Jarndyce
 Richard Harrington – Allan Woodcourt, a young doctor
 Di Botcher – Mrs. Woodcourt, Allan's mother
 Lisa Hammond – Harriet, servant to Mr. Jarndyce
 John Lynch – Nemo (Captain James Hawdon)
 Pauline Collins – Miss Flite, a kindly woman
 Tom Georgeson – Clamb, Mr. Tulkinghorn's clerk
 Alun Armstrong – Inspector Bucket, a police detective
 Seán McGinley – Snagsby, proprietor of a law stationery
 Burn Gorman – William Guppy, ambitious clerk at Mr Kenge's law firm
 Sheila Hancock – Mrs. Guppy, his mother
 Harry Eden – Jo, a street boy
 Charlie Brooks – Jenny, Jo's sister
 Johnny Vegas – Krook, Landlord of Nemo and Miss Flite
 Hugo Speer – Sergeant George, friend of Hawdon's from the military
 Michael Smiley – Phil Squod, the Sergeant's employee
 Katie Angelou – Charley Neckett, orphaned girl, Esther's maid
 Anne Reid – Mrs. Rouncewell, Lady Dedlock's housekeeper
 Tim Dantay – Mr. Rouncewell, her son, whose own son wishes to marry Rosa
 Richard Cant – Mercury, servant to the Dedlocks
 John Sheahan – Fortnum, servant to the Dedlocks
 Lilo Baur – Hortense, Lady Dedlock's French maid
 Emma Williams – Rosa, Lady Dedlock's maid
 Nathaniel Parker – Harold Skimpole, friend of Mr. Jarndyce
 Richard Griffiths – Mr. Bayham Badger, friend of Mr. Jarndyce
 Joanna David – Mrs. Badger, his wife
 Warren Clarke – Boythorn, friend of Mr. Jarndyce
 Phil Davis – Smallweed, a moneylender
 Tony Haygarth – Gridley, a man beset by legal woes 
 Kelly Hunter - Miss Barbary, Lady Dedlock's sister
 Liza Tarbuck – Mrs. Jellyby, a charitable woman
 Natalie Press – Caddy Jellyby, her daughter
 Bryan Dick – Prince Turveydrop, Caddy's fiancé, a dance teacher
 Matthew Kelly – Old Mr. Turveydrop, Prince's father
 Robert Pugh – Mr. Chadband, a friend of Snagsby's
 Catherine Tate – Mrs. Chadband, his wife
 Dermot Crowley – Mr. Vholes, Richard Carstone's lawyer
 Ian Richardson – Chancellor
 Peter Guinness – Coroner
 Louise Brealey – Judy, Smallweed's granddaughter
 Brian Pettifer – Mr. Growler, a physician

 Anthony Cozens – Usher
 Alastair Galbraith – Mr. Brownlow, a lawyer
 Alistair McGowan – Mr. Kenge
 Sevan Stephan – Mr. Tangle, a lawyer
 Roberta Taylor – Mrs. Pardiggle

Reception
Previewing the first episode of the serial in the BBC's Radio Times listings magazine in its week of broadcast, critic David Butcher wrote that: "Watching this extraordinary version of Dickens's novel feels less like watching a TV drama and more like sampling a strange other world... it's Gillian Anderson who, despite having only a handful of lines, is at the heart of the drama. It's a magnetic performance (one of many) in a tremendous piece of television."

In the same issue, the magazine—which also devoted its front cover to the programme, a fold-out photograph of the cast posing in modern glamorous dress in the style of a Dynasty-style soap opera cast—contained a preview feature by Christopher Middleton which went behind the scenes of the production. Middleton was equally positive about the adaptation. "The word 'big' doesn't really do it justice," he wrote.

The Radio Times kept up its positive reaction to the series throughout the programme's run. Of episode eight, Butcher again wrote a positive preview. "We're halfway through this mesmerising serial and it shows no sign of letting up," he wrote. "As ever, each frame is composed to perfection, each face lit like an oil painting, and the acting is out of this world. You might want to take the phone off the hook."

For the week of the final episode, the magazine's television editor, Alison Graham, joined in the praise, picking out individual cast members for particular attention. "Anna Maxwell Martin as Esther was a superb heroine, but in years to come it's [Gillian] Anderson's portrayal of a secretly tormented aristocrat that we'll treasure." And of Charles Dance, "As the scheming attorney-at-law, Dance was wolfishly lethal, his hooded eyes and sonorous voice loaded with evil. It's almost enough to make you take against lawyers."

The praise for the serial was not, however, universal. Writing for The Guardian newspaper, Philip Hensher criticised the programme sight unseen. Hensher's comments led Andrew Davies to write an open letter to The Guardian in response to Hensher's piece, which appeared in the paper two days after the original article. "I think you know that a film can do a lot more than action and dialogue..."

In terms of viewing figures, Bleak House began with an overnight average audience of 6.6 million for the one-hour opening episode, peaking at 7.2 million and averaging 29% of the total available viewing audience, winning its timeslot. Ratings continued to average around the five to six million mark, with the serial sometimes winning its timeslot but on occasions being beaten into second place by programming on ITV. Bleak Houses highest ratings came for the sixth episode on 11 November, which attracted an average of 6.91 million viewers and a 29.5% share of the audience.

The penultimate episode, broadcast on Thursday 15 December, gained an audience of 5.2 million, losing out to The Bill on ITV which gained 6.3 million viewers.

On 7 May 2006, Bleak House won the Best Drama Serial category at the British Academy Television Awards, one of the most prestigious industry awards in the UK, with Anna Maxwell Martin taking the Best Actress award ahead of fellow nominee Gillian Anderson.

In July 2006, the adaptation was nominated for 10 Primetime Emmy Awards, including Outstanding Miniseries, Lead Actor in a Miniseries or Movie (Charles Dance), Lead Actress in a Miniseries or Movie (Gillian Anderson), and Supporting Actor in a Miniseries or Movie (Denis Lawson). It won two Emmys, for Makeup and Cinematography.

Previous versions
The BBC had previously adapted the novel twice, in 1959 (eleven episodes) and 1985 (eight episodes). In the silent film era it was filmed in 1920 and 1922; the later version starred Sybil Thorndike as Lady Dedlock. The BBC also adapted the book for radio.

See also
 The Passion, a BBC drama by the same producer that uses the same soap-opera format.
 Dickensian, a BBC drama in the same half-hour format that serves in part as a prequel to Bleak House.

ReferencesFurther reading'

External links
 
 BBC Bleak House Press Pack
 PBS Masterpiece Theatre Bleak House site
 

2000s British drama television series
2005 British television series debuts
2005 British television series endings
BBC high definition shows
BBC television dramas
Peabody Award-winning television programs
Television shows based on works by Charles Dickens
Films based on works by Charles Dickens
English-language television shows
Television series set in the 1850s
Television shows set in England
Television shows written by Andrew Davies
Films directed by Susanna White
Works based on Bleak House